Enrique Wilson Martes (born July 27, 1973) is a Dominican former professional baseball player. In his eight-season Major League Baseball career, Wilson played with the Cleveland Indians (1997–2000), Pittsburgh Pirates (2000–01), New York Yankees (2001–04), and the Chicago Cubs (2005) as a utility infielder. He batted switch and threw right-handed.

Wilson was a career .244 hitter with 22 home runs, with three grand slams, and 141 RBI in 555 games. Versatile around the diamond, Wilson had a rather mobile career playing (mostly as a backup) at second base, third and shortstop. Wilson was known to play hitters well and with a strong arm, had some pop in his bat, and would run occasionally, but did not to try to steal very often.

In 2001, he was scheduled to be on American Airlines Flight 587 that crashed in a New York City neighborhood. However, when the Yankees lost the 2001 World Series to the Arizona Diamondbacks, Wilson flew home a few days earlier and was not on the flight.

In 2003, Wilson was involved in an incident where Manny Ramirez missed a game claiming to have a sore throat, but was later found to actually have been partying in a hotel room with Wilson. At the time, Wilson played for the rival New York Yankees.

During Wilson's time with the Yankees, he was often placed in the lineup over superior players when the team faced Boston Red Sox ace Pedro Martínez. This was due to his inexplicable ability to hit Martinez well over his career. In 35 at bats including the postseason, Wilson batted .364 vs Martinez.

Wilson was signed by the Baltimore Orioles to a minor-league contract before the 2005 season. He was released in May, and subsequently signed with the Cubs. After appearing in fifteen games with the Cubs, he was released a second time. In 2006, Wilson played for the Boston Red Sox's Triple-A team, the Pawtucket Red Sox, and retired in August.

Notes

Sources
The ESPN Baseball Encyclopedia – Gary Gillette, Peter Gammons, Pete Palmer. Publisher: Sterling Publishing, 2005. Format: Paperback, 1824pp. Language: English.

External links 
Enrique Wilson - Baseballbiography.com

1973 births
Baseball players at the 2007 Pan American Games
Buffalo Bisons (minor league) players
Canton-Akron Indians players
Chicago Cubs players
Cleveland Indians players
Columbus RedStixx players
Dominican Republic expatriate baseball players in Canada
Dominican Republic expatriate baseball players in the United States
Elizabethton Twins players
Gulf Coast Twins players
Kinston Indians players

Living people
Major League Baseball infielders
Major League Baseball players from the Dominican Republic
Nashville Sounds players
New York Yankees players
Ottawa Lynx players
Pawtucket Red Sox players
Pittsburgh Pirates players
Pan American Games competitors for the Dominican Republic